The Arseny Morozov House is a historic building located at 16 Vozdvizhenka Street, Moscow. It was designed by Viktor Mazyrin for his friend Arseny Morozov. The pair had toured around Portugal and been impressed by the Pena Palace in Sintra. An eclectic building with Neo-Manueline architecture, the Morozov House was constructed on the land presented to Arseny by his mother Varvara. Mazyrin built the house between 1895 and 1899.

According to the city legend, when she saw the finished mansion, Varvara Morozova exclaimed: "Only I used to know that you’re a fool, now the whole of Moscow will know!"

Anarchist Occupation
The building was one of over twenty expensive residences occupied by the Moscow Federation of Anarchist Groups following the February Revolution. The art theorist Aleksei Gan was amongst the group who occupied the building. The building still contained Ivan Morozov's collection of ceramics, silverware, icons and engraved portraits.  Gan spent a month as custodian of these objects.

References

Houses in Moscow
Houses completed in 1854
1854 establishments in the Russian Empire
Cultural heritage monuments of federal significance in Moscow